Las Ramblas may refer to:

 La Rambla, Barcelona (often called Las Ramblas), an iconic and busy street in central Barcelona
 Las Ramblas Resort, a canceled mixed-use project that was to be constructed in Paradise, Nevada, U.S.
Campo de Golf Las Ramblas, a golf course in Villamartin, Valencian Community of Spain

See also
La Rambla (disambiguation)